Germany competed at the 2015 World Aquatics Championships in Kazan, Russia from 24 July to 9 August 2015.

Medalists

Diving

Germany nominated 14 athletes to participate.

Men

Women

Mixed

High diving

Germany nominated 1 athlete to participate.

Open water swimming

Germany nominated eight athletes to participate.

Men

Women

Team

Swimming

German swimmers have achieved qualifying standards in the following events (up to a maximum of 2 swimmers in each event at the A-standard entry time, and 1 at the B-standard): Swimmers must qualify at the 2015 German Swimming Championships and the 2015 German Open (for pool events) to confirm their places for the Worlds.

Thirty-one swimmers have been nominated to the German team including world record holder Paul Biedermann in the freestyle and 2013 Worlds silver medalist Marco Koch in the breaststroke.

Men

Women

Mixed

Synchronized swimming

Germany nominated 1 athlete to participate.

References

External links
Official website

Nations at the 2015 World Aquatics Championships
2015 in German sport
Germany at the World Aquatics Championships